There are numerous awards for a best song, including:

Academy Award for Best Original Song
Broadcast Film Critics Association Award for Best Song
Golden Globe Award for Best Original Song
Grammy Award for Best Rock Song
Grammy Award for Best Song Written for Visual Media
Grammy Award for Best Country Song
Grammy Award for Best R&B Song
MTV Europe Music Award for Best Song
Zee Cine Award for Best Track of the Year